This article lists all the confirmed national football squads for the UEFA Women's Euro 1993.

Players marked (c) were named as captain for their national squad.

Denmark
Head coach:  Keld Gantzhorn

Head coach:  Gero Bisanz

Head coach:  Sergio Guenza

Head coach:  Even Pellerud

External links
 1993 – Match Details at RSSSF.com

1993